Michael Andrews, also known as Elgin Park, is an American multi-instrumental musician, producer, and film score composer. He is best known for a cover version of the Tears for Fears song "Mad World", which he recorded with Gary Jules for the Donnie Darko soundtrack, and which became the 2003 UK Christmas number one. He is a founding member of the San Diego soul-jazz band The Greyboy Allstars, where he goes by the moniker Elgin Park.

Soundtrack production
After joining The Greyboy Allstars following the dissolution of his band The Origin, Andrews fell into film score composition by chance in 1998 when The Greyboy Allstars were asked to score Jake Kasdan's first feature Zero Effect and worked on the music for the highly regarded (though short-lived) TV series, Freaks and Geeks. In 2000, Richard Kelly commissioned him to do the soundtrack for the film Donnie Darko. Its original score album went on to sell over 100,000 copies (in part because of Andrews's remake of Tears for Fears' "Mad World", featuring Gary Jules), and Andrews became a composer to watch. He has since gone on to compose scores for the movies Out Cold, Nothing, Cypher, Orange County, My Suicidal Sweetheart, Me and You and Everyone We Know, The TV Set, a segment of Paris, je t'aime,  Unaccompanied Minors, Bridesmaids, Walk Hard: The Dewey Cox Story and Daddy's Home among others.

Donnie Darko
In early 2000, Jim Juvonen gave Andrews a copy of the script for the as-yet-unmade feature film Donnie Darko. Director Richard Kelly knew Andrews worked with The Greyboy Allstars, and made music under the name Elgin Park.

Like his role models John Barry and Ennio Morricone, Andrews wanted a song on his otherwise instrumental score. He chose "Mad World" by Tears for Fears (originally released in 1982), which his childhood friend Gary Jules sang as Andrews played piano.

The first soundtrack record was released by Andy Factor, a friend of Andrews, through his Everloving Records label in 2002. As Donnie Darko was not a hit at first, there was little interest in the soundtrack in the US. The film was more popular in Europe, especially in the UK, where it outgrossed the US release.

This sparked interest in the soundtrack and "Mad World", which was a 2003 Christmas #1 on the UK Singles Chart. It reached the top 30 of the American Billboard Modern Rock chart in 2004 and hit #1 on the Canadian Digital Singles chart in January 2007. It charted in  countries like Ireland, Denmark, the Netherlands, and Australia in 2003 and 2004, and a snippet was used in the television commercial for the 2006 Xbox 360 video game Gears of War.

Me and You and Everyone We Know
In 2005, Andrews scored Me and You and Everyone We Know, a film by Miranda July praised at both Sundance and Cannes film festivals. The score to the film was released on Everloving Records on July 12, 2005.

Initially taking cues from the characters' dialogue, Andrews began writing the score. He came to understand the film's world as a kind of alternate reality where people believe in fate and chance—and this was the world he needed to paint with his music. He also saw the feelings July was trying to get across in her film as very primary. "She tries to break things down to very basic, simple shapes—the simplest shapes possible, and that totally influenced me in my music".

Working out of his custom-built backyard studio in Glendale, California, Andrews spent three months creating the score using an orchestra of obscure vintage synthesizers (a miniature hotwired Casio keyboard was unearthed at a garage sale for $10) and drum machines. His concept was to play what he termed amateurish, emotional, naïve, magical and simple music on highly unemotional, inorganic instruments—for example, a calculator with built-in twelve-note keyboard that lends a haunting portamento melody to one of the film's motifs.

Other instruments used in the score include Andrews's modified piano (rather than hitting the strings directly, the hammers first make contact with a piece of soft felt, creating a warmer, slightly muffled tone), as well as his Moog and Vocoder synthesizers. Despite all the electronic gear, no MIDI was used in the recording, so that all the humanness, all the subtle variations of rhythm, are intact. Inara George adds vocals in several climactic moments throughout the film. In some cases, cues were composed of only two or three tracks in order to attain the magical simplicity for which the film called out.

Solo career
Andrews released his first solo album, Hand on String, on his own newly established label, Elgin Park Recordings, in Summer 2006. He is credited on the album as Mike Andrews.

In August 2012, Andrews's second solo record "Spilling A Rainbow" was released on Everloving Records performed mostly alone, and with Dan Long and Steve Kaye recording.

Discography

Albums
 Elgin Park (2000)
 Hand on String (2006)
 Spilling a Rainbow (2012)

Singles

Productions/Appearances
 The Origin – The Origin (1990)
 The Origin – Bend (1992)
 'The Greyboy Allstars – West Coast Boogaloo (1993)
 Robert Walter – Spirit of '70 (player) (1994)
 Brendan Benson – One Mississippi (bass, guitars, background vocals) (1994)
 DJ Greyboy – Land of the Lost (guitar) (1996)
 Gary Jules – Greetings From The Side (producer) (1998)
 Elgin Park - Elgin Park (2000)
 DJ Greyboy – Mastered The Art (guitar) (2000)
 The Greyboy Allstars – Greyboy Allstars Live (2001)
 Gary Jules – Trading Snakeoil For Wolftickets (piano, producer) (2001)
 Michael Andrews – Donnie Darko: Music from the Original Motion Picture Score (songwriter, performer) (2002)
 Brendan Benson – Metarie EP (producer) (2003)
 Metric – Old World Underground, Where Are You Now?  (producer) (2004)
 Les Sans Culottes – Fixation Orale (producer) (2004)
 DJ Greyboy – Soul Mosaic (guitar) (2004)
 Inara George – All Rise (producer) (2005)
 Michael Andrews – Me and You and Everyone We Know (Original Motion Picture Score) (composer, performer) (2005)
 Michael Andrews – Hand on String (2005)
 Charlie Wadhams – Free Up Your Schedule (producer/player) (2007)
 The Greyboy Allstars – What Happened to Television (2007)
 Inara George & Van Dyke Parks – An Invitation (producer) (2008)
 Inara George – Accidental Experimental (producer/cowriter) (2009)
 Michael Andrews – Spilling a Rainbow (2012)
 The Greyboy Allstars – Inland Emperor (2013)
 Robert Walter – Get Thy Bearings (producer/player) (2013)
 Inara George – Dearest Everybody (producer) (2019)
 The Greyboy Allstars – Como De Allstars (2020)
 Brooks Nielsen – One Match Left (producer/player/songwriter) (2022)

Filmography
{| class="wikitable sortable"
|-
! Year
! Title
! Director(s)
! Studio(s)
|-
| 1999 || Chapter Zero || Aaron Mendelsohn || Arama Entertainment
|-
|rowspan="2"| 2001 || Donnie Darko || Richard Kelly || Newmarket Films
|-
| Out Cold || The Malloys || Touchstone Pictures
|-
|rowspan="2"| 2002 || Orange County || Jake Kasdan || Paramount Pictures
|-
| Cypher || rowspan=2| Vincenzo Natali || Pandora Cinema
|-
| 2003 || Nothing || Alliance Atlantis
|-
| 2005 || Me and You and Everyone We Know || Miranda July || IFC Films
|-
|rowspan="3"| 2006 || The TV Set || Jake Kasdan || ThinkFilm
|-
| Paris, je t'aime: La Vampire || Vincenzo Natali || First Look International
|-
| Unaccompanied Minors || Paul Feig || Warner Bros.
|-
| 2007 || Walk Hard: The Dewey Cox Story || Jake Kasdan || Columbia Pictures
|-
| 2009 || Funny People || Judd Apatow || Universal Pictures
|-
|rowspan="2"| 2010 || Cyrus || Jay DuplassMark Duplass || Fox Searchlight Pictures
|-
| She's Out of My League || Jim Field Smith || DreamWorks Pictures
|-
|rowspan="3"| 2011 || Bridesmaids || Paul Feig || Universal Pictures
|-
| Bad Teacher || Jake Kasdan || Columbia Pictures
|-
| Jeff, Who Lives at Home || Jay DuplassMark Duplass || Paramount Vantage
|-
|rowspan="2"| 2012 || The Five-Year Engagement || Nicholas Stoller || Universal Pictures
|-
| The Reluctant Fundamentalist || Mira Nair || IFC Films
|-
| 2013 || The Heat || Paul Feig || 20th Century Fox
|-
|rowspan="3"| 2014
| Neighbors || Nicholas Stoller || Universal Pictures
|-
| Tammy || Ben Falcone || Warner Bros.New Line Cinema
|-
| Sex Tape || Jake Kasdan || Columbia Pictures
|-
|rowspan="2"| 2015 || The Adderall Diaries || Pamela Romanowsky || A24
|-
| Daddy's Home || Sean Anders || Paramount PicturesRed Granite PicturesGary Sanchez Productions
|-
|rowspan="2"| 2016 || Dirty Grandpa || Dan Mazer || Lionsgate
|-
| Neighbors 2: Sorority Rising || Nicholas Stoller || Universal Pictures
|-
|rowspan="2"| 2017 || Daddy's Home 2 || Sean Anders || Paramount PicturesGary Sanchez Productions
|-
| The Big Sick || Michael Showalter || FilmNation EntertainmentApatow ProductionsAmazon Studios
|-
|rowspan="3"| 2018 || I Feel Pretty || Abby KohnMarc Silverstein || Voltage PicturesWonderland Sound and VisionSTXfilms
|-
| Instant Family || Sean Anders || Paramount PicturesClosest To Hole Productions
|-
|  Second Act || Peter Segal ||STXfilmsHuayi Brothers Pictures
|-
|rowspan="2"| 2019 || Against the Clock || Mark Polish || Benaroya PicturesGravitas Ventures
|-
|| Always Be My Maybe || Ali Wong || Netflix
|-
|rowspan="2"| 2020 || The Lovebirds || Michael Showalter ||Quinn's House3 Arts EntertainmentMedia Rights CapitalParamount PicturesNetflix
|-
|  The King of Staten Island || Judd Apatow ||Apatow ProductionsPerfect World PicturesUniversal Pictures
|-
|rowspan="2"| 2021 || Yes Day || Miguel Arteta || Netflix
|-
|Roadrunner: A Film About Anthony Bourdain || Morgan Neville || Focus Features
|-
|-
|rowspan="1"| 2022 || |The Bubble || Judd Apatow || |Apatow ProductionsNetflix
|-
|rowspan="2"| 2023 ||
You Hurt My Feelings
|| Nicole Holofcener || Likely StoryFilmNation EntertainmentA24
|-
|Totally Killer||Nahnatchka Khan || Blumhouse TelevisionDivide/ConquerAmazon Studios
|-
|}

Television Scores
 Freaks and Geeks (1999–2000)
 Undeclared (2001–2002)
 Wonderfalls (2004)
 Desire – Ford Mondeo (2007) – TV advertisement
 New Girl (2011) – Main Title Theme
 Ben and Kate (2012) – Main Title Theme
 Togetherness (Seasons 1&2 – 2016 HBO)
 The Zen Diaries of Garry Shandling (2017 HBO)
 Friends from College (2019 Netflix)
 City Of Ghosts (2021 Netflix)
 El Deafo'' (2022 AppleTV+)

References

External links
 
 
 Interview with Gary Jules and Michael Andrews, on BBC Radio 1
 Donnie Darko spotlight at everloving.com

Living people
American film score composers
American male film score composers
Musicians from San Diego
Ivor Novello Award winners
1967 births
Musicians from Glendale, California
The Greyboy Allstars members